
Gmina Kraśnik is a rural gmina (administrative district) in Kraśnik County, Lublin Voivodeship, in eastern Poland. Its seat is the town of Kraśnik, although the town is not part of the territory of the gmina.

Villages
Gmina Kraśnik contains the villages and settlements of Dąbrowa-Bór, Karpiówka, Kowalin, Lasy, Mikulin, Pasieka, Pasieka-Kolonia, Podlesie, Słodków Drugi, Słodków Pierwszy, Słodków Trzeci, Spławy Drugie, Spławy Pierwsze, Stróża, Stróża-Kolonia and Suchynia.

Neighbouring gminas
Gmina Kraśnik is bordered by the town of Kraśnik and by the gminas of Dzierzkowice, Szastarka, Trzydnik Duży, Urzędów, Wilkołaz and Zakrzówek.

External links
Gmina Kraśnik web page (in English)

References

Polish official population figures 2006

Gminas in Lublin Voivodeship
Gmina Krasnik